Madaba (Biblical Hebrew:  Mēḏəḇāʾ) is the capital city of Madaba Governorate in central Jordan, with a population of about 60,000. It is best known for its Byzantine and Umayyad mosaics, especially a large Byzantine-era mosaic map of the Holy Land.

History 
Madaba dates from the Middle Bronze Age.

The town of Madaba was once a Moabite border city, mentioned in the Bible in Numbers 21:30 and Joshua 13:9. Control over the city changed back and forth between Israel and Moab, as mentioned in the Mesha Stele.

During its rule by the Roman and Byzantine empires from the 2nd to the 7th centuries, the city formed part of the Provincia Arabia set up by the Roman Emperor Trajan to replace the Nabataean kingdom of Petra.

The first evidence for a Christian community in the city, with its own bishop, is found in the Acts of the Council of Chalcedon in 451, where Constantine, Metropolitan Archbishop of Bostra (the provincial capital) signed on behalf of Gaiano, "Bishop of the Medabeni." It was conquered by the Rashidun Caliphate in 629 after the Battle of Mut'ah.

During the rule of the Islamic Umayyad Caliphate, it was part of the southern district of Jund Filastin within the Bilad al-Sham province.

Modern settlement

In 1880, 90 Arab Christian-convert families from Al Karak resettled the ruins of Madaba, led by two Italian priests from the Latin Patriarchate of Jerusalem. This period saw the start of archaeological research. This in turn substantially supplemented the scant documentation available.

The Catholic Church's list of titular sees uses the spelling "Medaba", in reference to the ancient bishopric located in this city, while referring to the modern city as "Madaba".

Today, the city is the seat of Madaba Governorate and is the 9th-biggest city in Jordan, with a population of 122,008 as of 2021.

Archaeological finds

In Madaba city

The first mosaics were discovered during the building of new houses using bricks from older buildings. The new inhabitants of Madaba, made conscious of the importance of the mosaics by their priests, made sure that they took care of and preserved all the mosaics that came to light.

The northern part of the city turned out to be the area containing the greatest concentration of mosaics. During the Byzantine-Umayyad period, this northern area, crossed by a colonnaded Roman road, saw the building of the Church of the Map, the Hippolytus Mansion, the Church of the Virgin Mary, the Church of Prophet Elijah with its crypt, the Church of the Holy Martyrs (Al-Khadir), the Burnt Palace, the Church of the Sunna' family, and the church of the salaita family.

The Map of Madaba mosaic was discovered in 1896 and the findings were published a year later. This discovery drew the attention of scholars worldwide. It also positively influenced the inhabitants, who shared the contagious passion of F. Giuseppe Manfredi, to whom the rediscovery of most of the city's mosaics are owed. Madaba became known as the "City of Mosaics" in Jordan.

The Madaba Mosaic Map is a map of the region dating from the 6th century and preserved in the floor of the Greek Orthodox Basilica of Saint George, sometimes called the "Church of the Map". With two million pieces of coloured stone, the map depicts hills and valleys, villages and towns in Palestine and the Nile Delta. The mosaic contains the earliest extant representation of Byzantine Jerusalem, labeled the "Holy City." The map provides important details about its 6th-century landmarks, with the cardo, or central colonnaded street, and the church of the Holy Sepulchre clearly visible. This map is one key in developing scholarly knowledge about the physical layout of Jerusalem after its destruction and rebuilding in 70 AD.

Other mosaic masterpieces found in the Church of the Virgin and the Apostles and the Archaeological Museum, depict a profusion of flowers and plants, birds and fish, animals and exotic beasts, as well as scenes from mythology and everyday pursuits of hunting, fishing and farming. Hundreds of other mosaics from the 5th through the 7th centuries are scattered throughout Madaba.

The University of Toronto has been excavating in Madaba from 1996 until the present. Their efforts have focused primarily on the west acropolis where an open field has allowed access to uncover the entire sequence of occupation at Madaba from the modern period down to the Early Bronze Age levels. The most visible feature of this area is a  fortification wall built sometime in the 9th century BC, with subsequent rebuilds throughout its history.  There is also the remains of a well-preserved Byzantine-era house at the base of the fortification wall.

In 2010, a 3,000-year-old Iron Age temple containing several figurines of ancient deities and circular clay vessels used in Moabite religious rituals was discovered at Khirbat 'Ataroz near Mabada.

In Khirbat Ataruz

Khirbat Ataruz, also known as Ataroth, is mentioned prominently in the Mesha stele and its ruins are located in Madaba Governorate, outside of Madaba city. It was conquered by Israelite King Omri, as discussed in the Mesha stele, Book of Numbers 32, and 2nd Books of Kings 3:4-27. The oldest inscription in the Moabite language script, dated to the late 9th or early 8th century BCE, was found at Khirbat Ataruz.

Madaba Institute for Mosaic Art and Restoration
The Institute of Mosaic Art and Restoration was founded in 1992 as the Madaba Mosaic School, and funded by the Italian government. It was a high school which offered the Tawjihi, the Jordanian equivalent of a high school diploma. In 2007, the Ministry of Tourism and Antiquities, under the Department of Antiquities, partnered with USAID's Siyaha tourism development project, and the Italian government to launch the institute as a two-year, post-secondary educational program. The institute offers diplomas in Mosaic Art Production and Restoration. The institute is located between the Madaba Visitors Center and the Madaba Archaeological Park.

Climate
Madaba has a hot-summer Mediterranean climate (Köppen climate classification Csa). Most rain falls in the winter. About  of precipitation falls annually.

Points of interest

 Madaba's main attraction is its Byzantine mosaics, drawing many visitors, especially since the creation of an archaeological park. They cover the floors of houses and churches dating from the site's earliest period of habitation.

 Southwest of Madaba is Hammamat Ma'in (Ma'in Hot Springs), thermal mineral springs that for centuries have attracted people for its purported therapeutic properties.

 The nearby site of Umm ar-Rasas, south-east of Madaba on the edge of the semi-arid steppe, started as a Roman military camp and grew to become a town from the 5th century. It also has very large and well-preserved mosaics.

 At the southern entrance to Madaba, near the King's Highway, is the Church of the Apostles. The ruins of this Byzantine church date to 578 CE, and are currently being restored. It includes a mosaic known as the "Personification of the Sea", depicting a woman emerging from the sea, surrounded by mythical aquatic creatures and a hodgepodge of rams, bulls, parrots and exotic vegetation. The mosaic was signed by a mosaicist named Salamanios.

 
 A weaving project started by twelve women of the Bani Hamida tribe in 1985 produces woven items in traditionally bright colors. Traditional ground looms, assembled using stones and sticks, are used for the weaving, and the products can be found at numerous outlets in Jordan and abroad. Visitors can stop by the weaving rooms, located in the village of Mukawir, to see how the rugs are made. The women also make decorative candles.

 The American University of Madaba opened in 2011, and is located on a 100-acre campus outside the city.

International relations

Twin towns - sister cities
Madaba is twinned with:
  Bethlehem, Palestine
  Denton, Texas

See also
Isaiah 15

References

Bibliography
 Rantzow, George Louis Albert, de (German name Georg Ludwig Albrecht von Rantzau, often named Jørgen Ludvig Albert de Rantzow). Mémoires du comte de Rantzow, vol. 1, Pierre Mortier Amsterdam (1741). First translation ever published by Renate Ricarda Timmermann: Die Memoiren des Grafen von Rantzau, vol. 1, Profund-Verlag (2015),

External links

 visitmadaba.org
 American University of Madaba (AUM)
 Jordan Tourist Attractions
 Photos of Madaba from the American Center of Research

Archaeological sites in Jordan
Populated places in Madaba Governorate
Moab
Torah cities